Denise Johanna Zeefuik (born 7 November 1956) is a Dutch jazz singer. She was the first Dutch jazz soloist to be signed by Blue Note Records.

Early life 
She spent her childhood in Suriname and the Netherlands.

Education 
Denise studied law at the University of Utrecht. However, her interest in music tempted her to enroll herself into the Conservatorium van Amsterdam. She graduated the university as a vocal educator.

Discography
Source:
Studio albums
 Take It from the Top (Timeless, 1991)
 A Heart Full of Music (Timeless, 1993)
 I Was Born in Love with You (Blue Note, 1995)
 Different Colours (EMI, 1996)
 The Madness of Our Love (Blue Note, 1999)
 Thirst! (BV Haast, 2000)
 Gedicht Gezongen (Plattel Music, 2004)
 El Sendero (Maxanter, 2005)
 Ella!: Denise Jannah Sings Ella Fitzgerald (September, 2015)
 Lost & Found (Rhapsody Analog, 2017)

References

External links
 Official website of Denise Jannah

1956 births
Living people
21st-century Dutch women singers
21st-century Dutch singers
Dutch jazz singers
People from Paramaribo
Surinamese emigrants to the Netherlands
20th-century Surinamese women singers